Upendra (Devanagari: उपेन्द्र) is an Indian masculine given name. The meaning of the Sanskrit word  is "younger brother of Indra" and refers to either Krishna or Vishnu, who as a son of Aditi (or in the Vamana avatar) was born subsequently to Indra.

Persons with the name
 Upendra (actor), an Indian Kannada actor, director, producer, screenwriter, lyricist and singer
 Upendra Bhanja, 17th century poet of Odia literature
 Upendra Bhat, singer of Hindustani classical music
 Upendra Kumar (1941–2002), Indian music director mainly in Kannada and Oriya films
 Upendra Kushwaha (born 1960), Indian politician and minister
 Upendra Limaye (born 1969), Indian Marathi film actor 
 Upendra Sidhaye (born 1980), Indian screenplay and story writer
 Upendra Tiwari, Indian politician 
 Upendra Yadav, (born 1960), Nepali politician
 P. Upendra or Parvathaneni Upendra (1936–2009), Indian politician and minister
 Priyanka Upendra, Indian actress in Hindi, Telugu, Kannada, Tamil and Bengali films

References 

Indian masculine given names